Jim Sherrit (born September 29, 1948 at Lennox Castle in Glasgow, Scotland) is a former professional ice hockey player who played 193 games in the World Hockey Association winning two AVCO cups.  He played for the Houston Aeros and Denver Spurs.

References

External links 

1948 births
Cape Cod Cubs (EHL) players
Denver Spurs (WHA) players
Ottawa Civics players
Houston Aeros (WHA) players
Living people
Scottish ice hockey centres
Sportspeople from Glasgow
Expatriate ice hockey players in the United States
Expatriate ice hockey players in Canada
Scottish expatriate sportspeople in the United States
British expatriate ice hockey people
Scottish expatriate sportspeople in Canada